Scopula corrivalaria is a moth of the family Geometridae. It is found from Japan, Korea, China and the Russian Far East through Siberia and Russia to western Europe. In Europe, it ranges from northern Central Europe to the Mediterranean. The habitat consists of marshes and wet meadows.

Adults are cream to bone yellow. They are on wing from late June to mid July.

The larvae feed on Rumex hydrolapathum. Larvae can be found from August to May. The species overwinters in the larval stage.

Subspecies
Scopula corrivalaria corrivalaria
Scopula corrivalaria eccletica Prout, 1935

References

External links

Lepiforum.de

Moths described in 1862
Moths of Asia
Moths of Europe
corrivalaria